Liberation of Jurf Al Sakhar, codenamed Operation Ashura, was a two-day military operation by Iraqi government forces and Iranian-backed PMU forces beginning on 24 October 2014, aimed at retaking the strategic city of Jurf Al Sakhar near Baghdad from ISIL.
The operation was mainly aimed at preventing ISIS militants from reaching the holy cities of Karbala and Najaf, where ISIS threatened to carry out attacks against the millions of Shia visitors commemorating the Day of Ashura.

Background
Jurf Al Sakhar is a strategic town 50 kilometres south of the Iraqi capital. It is part of a predominantly Sunni ribbon that runs just south of Baghdad.

In 2014 Jurf Al Sakhar was captured by the Islamic State terrorist organization.

The town lies on a road usually taken by millions of Shia Muslim pilgrims who will be heading in droves to the holy Shia city of Karbala in the Day of Ashura in the holy month of Muharram in order to commemorate the death of Muhammad's grandson, Imam Hussein—one of the most revered figures in Shiite Islam. The Islamic State, which considers Shias apostates, was expected to attempt to target the observances.

According to Iraqi security officials, Jurf Al Sakhar "presents a specific danger to Karbala" and clearing the area is a key priority ahead of Ashura.

Five car bombings in the holy city of Karbala in the week preceding the operation added to its urgency.

Operation

On 24 October 2014 the operation was launched in the area by the Iraqi government forces and Iranian-backed Shia militias and volunteers caused the liberation of the city.

Badr Brigade commander Hadi al-Amiri claimed to have led the operation in tandem with the country's new interior minister, who is a member of his party. Unverified pictures circulated online showed Hadi al-Amiri with Qasem Soleimani, the commander of Iran's elite Quds Force, during the operation. An Iraqi security official and a militia fighter also claimed that Soleimani was present on the battlefield. There have been claims about presence of Iranian forces in the operation. According to a commander of the Shia militia group Kata'ib Hezbollah, there were no Iranian forces, "but if there was a presence of some individuals, it was all officially coordinated".
A commander said that Suleimani planned the operation "three months ago".

According to Iraqi security officials, 498 ISIS militants were killed during the operation. 35 of whom were from Saudi Arabia, 30 from Chechnya, and 24 from Syria. 60 of them were snipers or gunman and 29 others were suicide bombers.

On 29 October the Babil Government decided to lock the whole of Jurf Al Sakhar down to the area's displaced people for 8 months, so that to remove the numerous IEDs and clear the houses from bombs that has been placed by IS.
Some 100 explosive devices, left by insurgents as they retreated from Jurf al-Sakhar region, were defused and detonated by Iraqi forces.

Babylon Provincial Council announced that the name of Jurf al-Sakhar (meaning "rocky bank") was changed into Jurf al-Nasr (meaning "victory bank").

Reactions
 – Prime Minister Haider al-Abadi praised Iraq's "hero forces" for delivering a "fatal blow" against the Islamic State.
 – Deputy Foreign Minister for Afro-Arab Affairs Hossein Amirabdollahian congratulated the "Iraqi government and nation on liberation of Jurf Al Sakhar region".

In media
On 5 March 2015, Iranian TV channel IRIB 1 broadcast a documentary titled Jurf Al Sakhar, directed by Morteza Shaabani and filmed by Mostafa Seyfi during the Operation Ashura, depicting the Iranian-backed Shia militia fighting ISIS and liberating the Jurf Al Sakhar region.

References

Jurf al-Sakhar
Military operations of the Iraqi Civil War in 2014
Military operations of the War in Iraq (2013–2017) involving the Islamic State of Iraq and the Levant
Military operations of the War in Iraq (2013–2017) involving Quds Force
Military operations of the War in Iraq (2013–2017) involving Hezbollah
Military operations of the War in Iraq (2013–2017) involving the Popular Mobilization Forces
Jurf al-Sakhar